"Show Me The Way" is a single by the band Earth, Wind & Fire feat. Raphael Saadiq that was released in September 2004 on Sanctuary Records. The single rose to number 16 upon the Adult R&B Songs chart.

Overview
Show Me the Way came off EWF's 2005 studio album Illumination.

Critical reception
David Wild of Rolling Stone described the song as "characteristically dreamy". 
Rob Theakston of Allmusic noted that "the crown jewel of the album is unquestionably the eight-minute jam "Show Me the Way".   
Anthony Hatfield of the BBC called Show Me the Way "a highlight with its easy groove packaged in a neat, modern arrangement". As well People described the tune as a "lush ballad".

Show Me the Way was also Grammy nominated in the category of  Best R&B Performance by a Duo or Group with Vocals.

References 

2005 singles
Earth, Wind & Fire songs
Songs written by Raphael Saadiq
2005 songs